Zentene Palace is a manor house in the historical region of Courland, in western Latvia.

History

Originally the courtyard buildings consisted of a stable, a servant's house and a barn. The manor house was built in Late Classicism style for prince Liven, based on the Berlin architectural school between 1845 and 1850.

The former owners of the Zentene estate were Philipp von der Brüggen around 1540, Prince von der Saken in 1818 and the Lieven family from then on. In the 1920s the building went into public ownership, and from 1938 it housed the Zentene School.

See also
List of palaces and manor houses in Latvia

References

Palaces in Latvia
Tukums Municipality